The 2020 Georgia Southern Eagles softball team represented Georgia Southern University during the 2020 NCAA Division I softball season. The Eagles played their home games at Eagle Field at GS Softball Complex. The Eagles were led by third year head coach Kim Dean.

On March 12, the Sun Belt Conference announced the indefinite suspension of all spring athletics, including softball, due to the increasing risk of the COVID-19 pandemic.  On March 16, the Sun Belt formally announced the cancelation of all spring sports, thus ending their season definitely.

Preseason

Sun Belt Conference Coaches Poll
The Sun Belt Conference Coaches Poll was released on January 29, 2020. Georgia Southern was picked to finish seventh in the Sun Belt Conference with 36 votes.

{| class="wikitable"
|- align="center"
|align="center" Colspan="3" |Coaches poll
|- align="center"

|- align="center"
| 1 || Louisiana || 100 (10)
|- align="center"
| 2 || Troy || 85
|- align="center"
| 3 || UT Arlington || 77
|- align="center"
| 4 || Texas State || 74
|- align="center"
| 5 || Coastal Carolina || 56
|- align="center"
| 6 || Appalachian State || 47
|- align="center"
| 7 || Georgia Southern || 36'
|- align="center"
| 8 || South Alabama || 31
|- align="center"
| 9 || Louisiana-Monroe || 26
|- align="center"
| 10 || Georgia State || 18
|- align="center"
|}

Preseason All-Sun Belt team
Summer Ellyson (LA, SR, Pitcher)
Megan Kleist (LA, SR, Pitcher)
Julie Rawls (LA, SR, Catcher)
Reagan Wright (UTA, SR, Catcher)
Katie Webb (TROY, SR, 1st Base)
Kaitlyn Alderink (LA, SR, 2nd Base)
Hailey Mackay (TXST, SR, 3rd Base)
Alissa Dalton (LA, SR, Shortstop)
Jayden Mount (ULM, SR, Shortstop)
Whitney Walton (UTA, SR, Shortstop)
Tara Oltmann (TXST, JR, Shortstop)
Courtney Dean (CCU, JR, Outfield)Mekhia Freeman (GASO, SR, Outfield)Sarah Hudek (LA, SR, Outfield)
Raina O'Neal (LA, JR, Outfield)
Bailey Curry (LA, JR, Designated Player/1st Base)

National Softball Signing Day

Roster

Coaching staff

Schedule and resultsSchedule Source:'''
*Rankings are based on the team's current ranking in the NFCA/USA Softball poll.

References

Georgia Southern
Georgia Southern Eagles softball
Georgia Southern Eagles softball seasons